Sport Ekspres is a sports newspaper published in Albania. Initially a sports supplement of the newspaper Koha Jonë, it began publication twice a week as a regular newspaper in September 1995. Its first editor-in-chief was the journalist Fatmir Mëneri, a post he held until 2012. The paper started its daily publication in 2001 and today it's the most widely read sports newspaper in the country.

References 

Sports newspapers published in Albania